Kevin Payne may refer to:

Kevin Payne (American football) (born 1983), American football player
Kevin Payne (soccer) (1953–2022), American soccer executive
Kevin Payne (politician), American politician, member of the Arizona House of Representatives

See also
Kevin Paine or Keith Lee (born 1984), American professional wrestler